Vanderpump may refer to:

Lisa Vanderpump, British restaurateur and television personality
Vanderpump Dogs, American reality television series
Vanderpump Rules, American reality television series